Hsinchu station may refer to the following stations in Hsinchu or Hsinchu County, Taiwan:

Hsinchu HSR station, a Taiwan High Speed Rail station in Zhubei, opened in 2006
Hsinchu railway station, a TRA station on the West Coast and Neiwan lines in East District, opened in 1893